Neal Preserve is a  preserve in Manatee County, Florida abutting the southern portion of State Road 64 near the western approach of Anna Maria Island Bridge.

Overview 
Manatee County used federal grants and local money to buy the Perico Island site for $9 million in 2005 and then spent an additional $1.5 million towards building the preserve. The preserve opened to the public on April 9, 2014.

References

External links 
Official website

Nature reserves in Florida
Protected areas of Manatee County, Florida
2005 establishments in Florida
Parks in Manatee County, Florida